Sachin Tendulkar is a retired Indian cricketer who is widely acknowledged as one of the greatest batsman of all time, he is the most prolific run-scorer in international cricket. Tendulkar has scored the highest number of centuries (100 or more runs) in Test matches and One Day International (ODI) matches organised by the International Cricket Council. His total of 51 centuries in Test matches and 49 in ODIs are world records for highest number of centuries by a batsman. He became the first and only cricketer to score 100 international centuries when he made 114 against Bangladesh in March 2012.

After making his Test debut in 1989, Tendulkar achieved his first century against England at Old Trafford, Manchester in 1990; he made 119 not out. In Test matches, Tendulkar has scored centuries against all the Test cricket playing nations, and is the second batsman to score 150 against each of them. He has scored a century in at least one cricket ground of all Test cricket playing nations, except Zimbabwe. In October 2010, Tendulkar went past Brian Lara's record of 19 scores of 150 or more by hitting his 20th against Australia in Bangalore. He made his highest score in 2004, when he made 248 not out against Bangladesh at the Bangabandhu National Stadium, Dhaka. Tendulkar has scored six double centuries and remained unbeaten on 15 occasions. His centuries have come in 30 different cricket grounds, with 27 of them being scored in venues outside India. Tendulkar has been dismissed nine times between scores of 90 and 99.

Although Tendulkar made his ODI debut in 1989 it was only after five years he made his first century in the format. He made 110 against Australia in the third match of the Singer World Series at the R. Premadasa Stadium, Colombo in September 1994. In ODIs, Tendulkar has scored centuries against 11 different opponents. He has scored centuries against all cricketing nations that have permanent One Day International status. He was the first batsman to score a double century in ODIs, which he scored against South Africa at the Captain Roop Singh Stadium, Gwalior in 2010. He has scored 19 ODI centuries in India, compared to 30 in away or neutral venues. Seven of these centuries were hit at the Sharjah Cricket Association Stadium. He has been dismissed 18 times between the score of 90 and 99 and 17 times between the score of 80 and 89.

Key 
 *  Remained not out
   Captain of India in that match
   Man of the match

List of Test cricket centuries

List of ODI centuries

Sachin Tendulkar centuries and results for India

See also 
 List of career achievements by Sachin Tendulkar
 List of cricketers by number of international centuries scored
 Player of the Match awards (cricket)
 List of One Day International cricket records
 List of Test cricket records

Notes and references 
Notes

References

Further reading 

 
 

 

Indian cricket lists
Tendulkar, Sachin
Sachin Tendulkar